Gary Marshall Barnes (born September 13, 1939 in Fairfax, Alabama) is a former American football wide receiver in the National Football League for the Green Bay Packers, the Dallas Cowboys, the Chicago Bears, and the Atlanta Falcons. He played college football at Clemson University.

Early years
Barnes attended Valley High School, where he practiced football and basketball. He spent a year at Gordon Military Academy, before accepting a scholarship from Clemson University with the intention of playing both sports.

Head coach Frank Howard convinced him to just focus on football and eventually named him a starter at split end as a sophomore, registering 9 receptions for 216 yards and 3 touchdowns. He had a 68-yard touchdown reception in a 23-7 win over the seventh-ranked Texas Christian University in the 1959 Bluebonnet Bowl.

The next year, he posted 14 receptions for 256 yards and one touchdown. He was moved to halfback as a senior, finishing with 16 receptions for 247 yards, 8 carries for 31 yards and 3 touchdowns.

In 2002, he was inducted into the Clemson University Athletic Hall of Fame. In 2005, he was inducted in the South Carolina Athletic Hall of Fame.

Professional career

Green Bay Packers
Barnes was selected by the Green Bay Packers in the third round (41st overall) of the 1962 NFL Draft and was also selected by the New York Titans in the ninth round (69th overall) of the 1962 AFL Draft. As a rookie, he was a backup wide receiver, appearing in 13 games with no receptions and was a member of the 1962 NFL Championship team.

In 1963, he was traded to the Dallas Cowboys in exchange for a fifth round draft choice (#60-Duke Carlisle).

Dallas Cowboys
In 1963, he appeared in 12 games (3 starts), registering 15 receptions for 195 yards. On June 18, 1964, he was traded to the Chicago Bears in exchange for defensive end Maury Youmans.

Chicago Bears
In 1964, the Chicago Bears acquired Barnes for depth purposes and he only recorded 4 receptions for 61 yards. He was waived in August 1965.

Philadelphia Eagles
On August 23, 1965, he was signed as a free agent by the Philadelphia Eagles. He was released 7 days later on August 30.

Atlanta Falcons
In 1965, Barnes was the first player signed to a contract by the Atlanta Falcons in team history. He was asked to play for a semi-pro football team in Huntsville, to keep in shape since the franchise was still a year away from beginning play. The next season, he scored the first touchdown in Falcons history, with a 53-yard reception from quarterback Randy Johnson during a 14–19 loss in the season opener against the Los Angeles Rams. On November 25, 1966, he was released to make room for rookie Richard Koeper.

Barnes was re-signed in January 1967. He was released on September 4, 1968. Although he had an opportunity to try out for other teams, he opted to retire, finishing with 60 career games, 41 receptions for 583 yards and 2 touchdowns.

Personal life
After football, he worked in the fiber division of Chevron Corporation. He also operated a textile business and was an investment adviser.

In 1986, although he had no previous legal experience, he was asked  by then-Clemson City Council member Gaston Gage to become Clemson's first full-time municipal judge. He spent 30 years in that job until retiring in 2015.

References

External links
 Barnes Is A 'traveler' Even Today
 From the Football Field to the Bench

1939 births
Living people
People from Valley, Alabama
Players of American football from Alabama
American football wide receivers
Clemson Tigers football players
Green Bay Packers players
Dallas Cowboys players
Chicago Bears players
Atlanta Falcons players